The following is an overview of the events of 1885 in film, including a list of notable births.

Events

 American inventors George Eastman and Hannibal Goodwin each invent a sensitized celluloid base roll photographic film to replace the glass plates then in use.

Births

References 

Film by year
Film